Junior Silva Ferreira (born September 26, 1994), also known as Juninho, is a Brazilian footballer who plays for J2 League club Tochigi SC.

Career statistics

Last update: end of 2022 season

References

External links

1994 births
Living people
Brazilian footballers
J2 League players
FC Osaka players
Kyoto Sanga FC players
Tochigi SC players
Association football midfielders